Pterostylis torquata, commonly known as the collared greenhood, is a species of orchid endemic to New South Wales. As with similar greenhoods, the flowering plants differ from those which are not flowering. The non-flowering plants have a rosette of leaves flat on the ground but the flowering plants have a single flower with leaves on the flowering stem. This greenhood has a white flower with dark green and dark brown markings, although in some areas, the flowers lack the brown markings. The sinus between the lateral sepals is platform-like.

Description
Pterostylis torquata is a terrestrial, perennial, deciduous, herb with an underground tuber and when not flowering, a rosette of dark green leaves lying flat on the ground. The flower is usually white with dark green and dark brown markings. The dorsal sepal and petals are fused, forming a hood or "galea" over the column, the dorsal sepal with a short point on its end. The sinus between the lateral sepals bulges platform-like and is usually dark brown. Flowering occurs from February to May.

Taxonomy and naming
Pterostylis torquata was first formally described in 1997 by David Jones from a specimen collected on the Northern Tablelands and the description was published in The Orchadian. The specific epithet (torquata) is a Latin word "adorned with a necklace or collar".

Distribution and habitat
The collared greenhood grows in forest on the Northern Tablelands.

References

torquata
Endemic orchids of Australia
Orchids of New South Wales
Plants described in 1997